Jacques Languirand, OC (May 1, 1931 – January 26, 2018) was a Canadian radio host, writer, actor and director.

He hosted the same radio show, Par 4 chemins on Radio-Canada, for 42 years. He was awarded the C.M. (Member of the Order of Canada) on December 21, 1987, and the O.C. (Officer of the Order of Canada) on May 8, 2003, for his services to communications in Canada.

In 2012, audiences saw him as the lead actor of Martin Villeneuve's Mars et Avril, a science fiction film based on the graphic novels of the same name.

He was the father of Pascal Languirand, best known as the leader and founder of synthpop band Trans-X.

Awards
 1956: Sir Barry Jackson Award for Les Insolites
 1956: Laflèche Award for Le Dictionnaire insolite
 1962: Governor General's Award for Les Insolites and Les Violons de l’automne
 1968: Commonwealth Arts Festival Award for Klondyke
 1978: The Librarian Award for La Voie initiatique
 1987: Member of the Order of Canada
 1998: Award from Quebec's Philosophers Company
 1998: Year's best communicator from The International Association of Communication Professionals
 2001: Special Jury's Award of the Onassis Foundation for Faust et les radicaux libres.
 2002: Honoris Causa Doctorate from McGill University
 2003: Officer of the Order of Canada
 2004: Knight of National Order of Quebec
 2004: Georges-Émile-Lapalme Award for exceptional use of the French language
 2006: 31st member of the Phoenix Circle for the environnement
 2006: Governor General's Performing Arts Award, Canada's highest honour in the performing arts
 2008: Knight of the Pléiade Order, Francophonie Order and Dialogue of cultures
 2009: Member of the Monique-Fitz-back Circle

Bibliography

Theatre plays
 1956: Les Insolites
 1956: Le Roi ivre
 1957: Les Grands Départs
 1957: Le Gibet
 1958: Diogène
 1960: Les Violons de l'automne
 1962: Les Cloisons
 1963: Klondyke
 1966-1970: Man Inc.
 2001: Faust et les radicaux libres
 2012: Feedback

Opera
 1966: Louis Riel

Essays
 1960: J'ai découvert Tahiti et les îles du bonheur
 1962: Le Dictionnaire insolite
 1972: De McLuhan à Pythagore
 1978: La Voie initiatique : le sens caché de la vie
 1979: Vivre sa vie (adapted from the TV series)
 1980: Mater materia
 1981: Vivre ici maintenant (adapted from the TV series)
 1984: Réincarnation et karma (in collaboration with Placide Gaboury)
 1987: Prévenir le burn-out (also published under the title Vaincre le mal-être by Albin Michel)
 1989: A comme Aubergine : 108 recettes sans viande (in collaboration with Yolande Languirand)
 1989-1991: Par 4 chemins (adapted from the radio show)
 1998: Les Voyages de Languirand ou le journal de Prospéro
 2001: Presque tout Languirand – Théâtre
 2008: Le Dieu cosmique : À la recherche du Dieu d'Einstein (in collaboration with Jean Proulx)
 2009: L’héritage spirituel amérindien. Le grand mystère (in collaboration with Jean Proulx)

Novel
 1963: Tout compte fait

Filmography
 1968: Kid Sentiment
 1994: A Hero's Life (La Vie d'un héros) ... Monsieur le juge
 1997: J'en suis! ... Igor de Lonsdale
 1998: Le Lépidoptère (short film) ... Voice On The Radio (voice)
 1999: The Big Snake of the World (Le Grand serpent du monde)
 2002: Alice's Odyssey ... Père Noël
 2007: La chambre bleue (short film) ... Narrator (voice)
 2012: Mars and April (Mars et Avril) ... Jacob Obus

Television
 1957: Le Colombier (TV series) ... Le mari de Grandmont
 2004-2007: Le Rebut Global ... Le philosophe
 2011-2012: "Les Repères de Languirand" ... Host

References

External links

 Les repères de Languirand
 Par 4 chemins' official site
 Radio-Canada's site for Par 4 chemins
 Interviews and references on Stéphan Bureau's site: Contact
 Analysis of Languirand's biography
 Les 4 chemins de Jacques Languirand, Jacques Bouchard's radio show
 Fiche sur L'île, Quebec's writers infocenter
 

1931 births
2018 deaths
French Quebecers
Canadian radio personalities
Members of the Order of Canada
Canadian male film actors
Canadian male television actors
Male actors from Montreal
Governor General's Performing Arts Award winners
Knights of the National Order of Quebec
Neurological disease deaths in Quebec
Deaths from Alzheimer's disease
Officers of the Order of Canada